Ajay Chandrakar (born 24 June 1963) is an Indian politician and former Cabinet Minister in Government of Chhattisgarh. He is a member of Bharatiya Janata Party.

Early life and education
Most of Ajay Chandrakar's education took place in his native Kurud. After completion of higher secondary education, he did graduation from SBR College in Bilaspur. Always a self-learner, he pursued MA (Hindi literature) from Pt. Ravi Shankar Shukla University enrolling at Durga Mahavidyalaya, Raipur.
His research in the plays of Vishnu Prabhakar was hindered by growing political agitation prevalent during those days. 
He is a voracious reader; even when he was elected to the assembly, he was considered to be the most studious among all the other assembly members.

Political career
Shri Ajay Chandrakar has always been actively involved in the political arena and social activities of his local constituency as a student and a concerned citizen. He was considered a firebrand student leader. Influenced by Swami Vivekananda's ideology, he's been very keen and invigorating as a politician. 
As a student he always sought to help out and in order to help people on a larger scale, he sought to enter politics as he felt it was the only medium that would allow his goodwill and the benefits of his efforts, to reach a maximum number of the country's masses. 
In 1998, Shri. Ajay Chandrakar became a legislator for the first time on the basis of the ticket allocated to him by the Bharatiya Janata Party. But even before this, he had been at the helm of many political movements and agitations. 
In 1987, he even spent 7 days in jail for participating in an agitation. He considers this 7-day custody to be one of his biggest achievements. 
In 2003, he became a part of the Chhattisgarh government as a Panchayat and Rural Development Minister as well as a Minister of Parliamentary Affairs. 
In 2004, he was also assigned the portfolios of Science and Technology, Technical Education, and Manpower Planning. Due to a reshuffling of the cabinets in 2007, he became the Minister of Higher Education.
In 2008, he suffered an unfortunate loss in the Legislative Assembly elections. Nevertheless, he was made the Head of the State Finance Commission, by the party recognizing his expertise and capacity.
After the completion of his tenure, he was chosen to take up the dual responsibilities of being the party's vice-chairman and official spokesperson.
At present he is the state minister Panchayat and Rural Development, Parliamentary Affairs, Public Health, Family Welfare and Medical Education Department. 
He tabled the special court's bill 2015 in the state assembly on behalf of the chief minister.
The Bill provides for an effective deterrent against corrupt public servants.

Jandarshan Program
From time to time he keeps meeting with the people of his constituency and rest of the Chhattisgarh at his residence through the Janadarshan program. People of the state come with grievances and pleas. There`s a beeline of people in his residency and he spends most of his evenings addressing their grievances.

President of Chhattisgarh Football Association 
Shri Ajay Chandrakar was unanimously elected as President of Chhattisgarh Football Association (CFA) during the annual general meeting of the Association held in Nov 2014.

Contribution to Kurud Constituency 
Mr. Ajay Chandrakar`s contribution to the Kurud constituency has been immense, with massive investment in the development of rural infrastructure in terms of the basic amenities and implementation of novel technology in the remotest parts of his constituency.

An Avid Environmentalist 
Mr. Ajay Chandrakar is an avid environmentalist. Hailing from a state that is covered with lush forest of about 44% of its total geography, he advocates and practices planting of trees and taking care of the diminishing forest reserves. On many occasions he took initiative to plant saplings, encouraging school and college students to enthusiastically follow the same. He quips "to balance the loss (of vegetation in the region), we need to participate in massive plantation drive."

Role in development of Sirpur world heritage site 
He has been on the forefront to give SIRPUR a world heritage site. He has asked the officials of the archeological treasure trove to prepare documents on the varied traditions, customs, rituals and history of the state in vernaculars and also in Chhattisgarhi. He actively participates and promotes the cultural and literary fests held in Sirpur annually.

Ajay Chandrakar is actively involved in the development of the cultural and literary activities of the state, promoting the state Raj-Bhasha Chhattisgarh and engaging various organelles of the public and private forums to engage and improve the status of Chhattisgarh in the literary status of the nation.

Development through state tourism 
Shri Ajay Chandrakar strongly advocates that the development of tourism industry in Chhattisgarh will help in creating employment opportunities for youth of the State and this will save them from influence of Naxals, a movement that has been a major stumbling block in development and progress of the state for more than 2 decades.

He has emphasized the state government`s plan of expanding world class tourism facilities in Naxal affected Bastar and the impoverished of all districts in Chhattisgarh, Surguja. This would in future enable the local youths by more employment opportunities and infrastructural development in the respective districts.

Religion and influences 
Mr. Ajay Chandrakar identifies himself as an orthodox, Hindu nationalist adhering to the ideologies of Swami Vivekananda, which is very much evident in his speeches and day-to-day activities in the assembly and in his personal life. "Arise, awake and stop not until the goal is reached", this sloka from the Katha Upanishad popularized by Swami Vivekananda, remains Ajay Chandrakar`s motto and guiding principle.

References

External links
 Ajay Chandrakar official website
 Official Facebook

Living people
State cabinet ministers of Chhattisgarh
1963 births
Chhattisgarh MLAs 2013–2018
People from Dhamtari district
Bharatiya Janata Party politicians from Chhattisgarh
Chhattisgarh MLAs 2018–2023
Madhya Pradesh MLAs 1998–2003
Chhattisgarh MLAs 2000–2003
Chhattisgarh MLAs 2003–2008
Indian football executives